Philip Glenn (born October 19, 1987) is an American violinist, pianist, and mandolinist. He is best known for his work on Psychic Temple IV (2017), How it All Goes Down (2017), and Outsider (2018).

Early life
Glenn was born in Los Angeles, California.

Glenn received a B.A. in Violin Performance and Music Education from Biola University. He was the 2011 Daniel Pearl Memorial Violin Recipient.

Career

In 2011, Glenn joined The Show Ponies and performed on Here We Are! (2012), We're Not Lost (2013), Run For Your Life (2014), and How It All Goes Down (2017). The Show Ponies performed their last concert on March 17, 2018 at Bottom of the Hill in San Francisco, California.

In 2016, Glenn joined Psychic Temple and performed on Psychic Temple Plays Music For Airports (2016), Psychic Temple III (2016), and Psychic Temple IV (2017).

On January 12, 2018, Glenn released his debut solo album Outsider (2018) on Joyful Noise Recordings / BIG EGO Records. The album was produced by Chris Schlarb.

Glenn is a session musician for BIG EGO Studios in Long Beach, California.

Personal life
Glenn is of Filipino and Scottish descent

Discography
Studio Albums

Solo
 Outsider (2018) (Joyful Noise Recordings / BIG EGO Records)

With The Show Ponies
 Here We Are! (2012) 
 We're Not Lost (2013)
 Run For Your Life (2014) 
 How It All Goes Down (2017) (Entertainment One)

With Psychic Temple
 Psychic Temple Plays Music For Airports (2016) (Joyful Noise Recordings)
 Psychic Temple III (2016) (Asthmatic Kitty)
 Psychic Temple IV (2017) (Joyful Noise Recordings)

Misc. Studio Sessions
 Shining Stars (2010)
 Post Mortem (2011)
 Strange Rain (2011) (Erik Loyer / Opertoon)
 Dropsy (2015) (Joyful Noise Recordings)
 Call Me Back Home (2018) (Joyful Noise Recordings / BIG EGO Records)

References

External links
Philip Glenn Bandcamp
BIG EGO Records 2018 Album Catalog

1987 births
Living people
People from Los Angeles
American fiddlers
American bluegrass musicians
American classical musicians
American session musicians
American male pianists
21st-century American pianists
21st-century American violinists
21st-century American male musicians